Aleksandar Stojanovski (born February 16, 1983) is a Macedonian footballer playing with the York Region Shooters of the Canadian Soccer League.

Playing career 
Stojanovski began his career in 2004 in the Macedonian First Football League with FK Belasica. In his debut season he recorded 26 goals which made him the league's top goalscorer. In 2005, he went abroad to Croatia to play with HNK Cibalia in the Croatian First Football League. The following season, he returned to Macedonia to sign with FK Pobeda, where he won the league title. He briefly played abroad in the First Professional Football League with OFC Belasitsa Petrich in 2007. He returned to his native country to play with FK Napredok, FK Makedonija Gjorče Petrov, FK Teteks. In 2012, he signed with the Serbian White Eagles FC in the Canadian Soccer League, and played in the Premier League of Bosnia and Herzegovina with FK Leotar. In 2012, he returned to Macedonia to play with FK Milano Kumanovo, FK Gorno Lisiče, and FK Sileks. In 2015, he returned to the CSL to play with the York Region Shooters, where he won the regular season title in 2016.

References 

1983 births
Living people
Footballers from Skopje
Association football forwards
Macedonian footballers
FK Belasica players
HNK Cibalia players
FK Pobeda players
FK Makedonija Gjorče Petrov players
PFC Belasitsa Petrich players
FK Napredok players
FK Teteks players
Pécsi MFC players
FK Milano Kumanovo players
FK Leotar players
Serbian White Eagles FC players
FK Sileks players
FK Gorno Lisiče players
FK Metalurg Skopje players
York Region Shooters players
Macedonian First Football League players
Croatian Football League players
Macedonian Second Football League players
First Professional Football League (Bulgaria) players
Nemzeti Bajnokság I players
Premier League of Bosnia and Herzegovina players
Canadian Soccer League (1998–present) players
Macedonian expatriate footballers
Expatriate footballers in Croatia
Macedonian expatriate sportspeople in Croatia
Expatriate footballers in Bulgaria
Macedonian expatriate sportspeople in Bulgaria
Expatriate footballers in Bosnia and Herzegovina
Macedonian expatriate sportspeople in Bosnia and Herzegovina
Expatriate soccer players in Canada